Procecidocharoides is a genus of tephritid  or fruit flies in the family Tephritidae.

Species
These three species belong to the genus Procecidocharoides:
Procecidocharoides flavissima Foote, 1960
Procecidocharoides penelope (Osten Sacken, 1877)
Procecidocharoides pullata Foote, 1960

References

Tephritinae
Tephritidae genera
Diptera of South America